Puquina (or Pukina) is a small, putative language family, often portrayed as a language isolate, which consists of the extinct Puquina language and Kallawaya, although it is assumed that the latter is just a remnant of the former mixed with Quechuan. The Qhapaq simi, which was spoken by the Inca elite, in contrast to the Quechuan-speaking commoners, is thought to be related, as well as the Leco language, generally considered a language isolate. They are spoken by several native ethnic groups in the region surrounding Lake Titicaca (Peru and Bolivia) and in the north of Chile. Puquina itself is often associated with the culture that built Tiwanaku.

Background
Remnants of the single, ancestral Puquina language can be found in the Quechuan and Spanish languages spoken in the south of Peru, mainly in Arequipa, Moquegua and Tacna, as well as in Bolivia. There also seem to be remnants in the Kallawaya language, which may be a mixed language formed from Quechuan languages and Puquina. (Terrence Kaufman (1990) finds the proposal plausible.)

Some theories claim that "Qhapaq Simi", the cryptic language of the nobility of the Inca Empire, was closely related to Puquina, and that Runa Simi (Quechuan languages) were spoken by commoners. The Leco language might also be related.

Moulian et al. (2015) argue that Puquina language influenced Mapuche language of southern Chile long before the rise of the Inca Empire. This areal linguistic influence may have started with a migratory wave arising from the collapse of the Tiwanaku Empire around 1000 CE.

Sometimes the term Puquina is used for the Uru language, which is distinctly different.

Classification

Puquina has been considered an unclassified language family, since it has not been proven to be firmly related to any other languages in the Andean region. A relationship with the Arawakan languages has long been suggested, based solely on the possessive paradigm (1st no-, 2nd pi-, 3rd ču-), which is similar to the Proto-Arawakan subject forms (1st *nu-, 2nd *pi-, 3rd *tʰu-). Jolkesky (2016: 310–317) has presented further possible lexical cognates between Puquina and the Arawakan languages, proposing that this language family belongs to the putative Macro-Arawakan stock along with the Candoshi and the Munichi languages. However, such a hypothesis still lacks conclusive scientific evidence.

In this regard, Adelaar and van de Kerke (2009: 126) have pointed out that if in fact the Puquina languages are, genetically, related to the Arawakan languages, its separation from this family must have occurred at a relatively early date; the authors further suggest that in such a case the location of the Puquina speakers should be taken into account in the debate over the geographic origin of the Arawakan family. Such consideration was taken up by Jolkesky (op. cit., 611–616) in his archaeo-ecolinguistic model of diversification of the Macro-Arawakan languages. According to this author, the proto-Macro-Arawakan language would have been spoken in the Middle Ucayali River Basin during the beginning of the 2nd millennium BCE and its speakers would have produced the Tutishcainyo pottery found in this region.

Jolkesky (2016) classifies Puquina as a Macro-Arawakan language.

Language contact
Jolkesky (2016) notes that there are lexical similarities with the Jaqi, Kawapana, Kechua, Pano, and Uru-Chipaya language families due to contact.

Vocabulary
Numerals in Puquina and other nearby languages:

{| class="wikitable sortable"
! Numeral !! Puquina !! Kallawaya !! Uru !! Quechua !! Aymara
|-
! 1
|  ||  ||  ||  || 
|-
! 2
| so || soo || pisqe || iskay || paya
|-
! 3
| qapa || qapi || chcp || kimsa || kimsa
|-
! 4
| sper || pili || pakpik || tawa || pusi
|-
! 5
| taqpa || chisma || paanuqo || pisqa || pisqa
|-
! 6
| chichun || tajwa || pachuy || suqta || sojta (qallqo)
|-
! 7
| stu || kajsi || tohonqo || qanchis || pa qallqo
|-
! 8
| kina || wasa || qonqo || pusaq || kimsa qallqo
|-
! 9
| cheqa || nuki || sanqaw || isqun || lla-tunqa
|-
! 10
| sqara || jocha || qalo || chunka || tunqa
|}

Pronouns in Puquina and other nearby languages:

{| class="wikitable sortable"
! English !! Puquina !! Kallawaya !! Uru !! Quechua !! Aymara
|-
! I
| ni || nisi || wiril || ñuqa || naya
|-
! you (sg.)
| pi || chuu || amp || qam || juma
|-
! he
| chu, hi || chuinin || tis, nis || pay || jupa
|-
! we (inclusive)
| nich || nisiyku || uchumi || ñuqayku || jiwasa
|-
! we (exclusive)
| señ || nisinchej || wisnaqa || ñuqanchik || nanaka
|-
! you (pl.)
| pich || chuukunas || ampchuqa || qamkuna || jumanaka
|-
! they
| chuch || chuininkuna || nisnaqa || paykuna || jupanaka
|}

Loukotka (1968) lists the following basic vocabulary items for Puquina and Kallawaya (which he calls Pohena).

{| class="wikitable"
! gloss !! Puquina !! Kallawaya
|-
! one
| pesk || uxsi
|-
! two
| so || suyo
|-
! three
| kapak || kxapi
|-
! head
|  || kxutu
|-
! eye
| sekbi || paxañi
|-
! hand
| kupi || sui
|-
! woman
| atago || atasi
|-
! water
| unu || mimi
|}

References

Bibliography

 Adelaar, Willem and van de Kerke, Simon (2009). "Puquina." In: Mily Crevels and Pieter Muysken (eds.) Lenguas de Bolivia, vol. I, 125-146. La Paz: Plural editores. (in Spanish)
Aguiló, F. (1991). Diccionario kallawaya. La Paz: MUSEF
Girault, L. (1989). Kallawaya: el idioma secreto de los incas. Diccionario. Bolivia: UNICEF/OPS/OMS.
La Grasserie, R. de. (1894). Langues Américaines: langue Puquina; textes Puquina. Leipzig: Köhler.
 Jolkesky, Marcelo (2016). Estudo arqueo-ecolinguístico das terras tropicais sul-americanas. Brasilia: UnB. PhD Dissertation. Available here.

Language isolates of South America
Indigenous languages of the Andes
Extinct languages of South America
Languages extinct in the 18th century
Languages of Peru
Languages of Bolivia